Drazin may refer to:

People
 Israel Drazin, US Brigadier General
 Michael P. Drazin, an American mathematician
Drazin inverse, mathematical theory by Michael P. Drazin
 Philip Drazin, a British mathematician

Places
 Dražin Do, a village in Bosnia and Herzegovina
 Drazin, Iran, a village in Kerman Province, Iran

See also
 Draza (disambiguation)
 Draža (given name)
 Dražan (disambiguation)
 Dražen (disambiguation) 
 Dražen (given name)